Clément Bessaguet (born 29 May 1991) is a French sport shooter.

He participated at the 2018 ISSF World Shooting Championships, winning a medal.

References

External links

Living people
1991 births
French male sport shooters
ISSF pistol shooters
Sportspeople from Montpellier
Universiade bronze medalists for France
Universiade medalists in shooting
Shooters at the 2015 European Games
Shooters at the 2019 European Games
European Games medalists in shooting
European Games bronze medalists for France
Shooters at the 2020 Summer Olympics
21st-century French people